Rogério da Silva Bispo (born 16 November 1985) is a Brazilian long jumper. He finished eleventh at the 2004 World Junior Championships and at the 2007 Pan American Games. He also competed at the 2006 World Indoor Championships and the 2007 World Championships without reaching the final.

Achievements

References

1985 births
Living people
Brazilian male long jumpers
Athletes (track and field) at the 2007 Pan American Games
Athletes (track and field) at the 2011 Pan American Games
Pan American Games athletes for Brazil
20th-century Brazilian people
21st-century Brazilian people